Radius Intelligence Inc. was an American software company that provided a marketing platform for targeting small businesses. The company tracked and collected information from hundreds of thousands of sources about more than 25 million small businesses in the United States.  The company publicly stated it planned to build products that are directly competitive with Dun & Bradstreet. In 2019, it was acquired by Kabbage.

History
Founded in 2009, Radius started out as purely a data company focused on aggregating location data and in April 2012 launched publicly.
 
By 2014, Radius has been funded by American Express, BlueRun Ventures, and Formation 8. The company has publicly announced three rounds of funding: $6.75 million for the seed round, $12.4 million for the Series A round, and $13 million for the Series B round.

On July 29, 2015, Radius announced a $50 million investment (Series C) by Founders Fund, AME Cloud Ventures, Formation 8, and Salesforce Ventures.

In May 2018, the company announced its intention to merge with Leadspace. In September 2019, Kabbage announced that it acquired Radius.

Darian Shirazi is the main founder of Radius.

References

Software companies based in California
Defunct software companies of the United States